A grandfather is a father of someone's parent.

Grandfather may also refer to:

 Grandfather clause, also known as grandfathering
 The Grandfather, a novel by Ellen Pickering
 The Grandfather (1925 film) (El abuelo), Spanish silent film
 The Grandfather (1954 film) (El abuelo), Argentine film
 The Grandfather (1986 film), Iranian film, starring Jamshid Mashayekhi
 The Grandfather (1998 film) (El abuelo), Spanish film
 "The Grandfather", a 1982 episode of Bosom Buddies
 "The Grandfather" (Gossip Girl), a 2009 episode of Gossip Girl
 "El Abuelo" (The Grandfather), 2017 Peruvian-Colombian road comedy-drama film
 "Grandfather" (poem), a poem by Nikolai Nekrasov
 Grandfather, North Carolina